The 2015 Tajik League is the 24th season of Tajik League, the Tajikistan Football Federation's top division of association football. FC Istiklol are the defending champions, having won the previous season.

Teams

Managerial changes

League table

Results

Top scorers

Hat-tricks

 4 Player scored 4 goals
 5 Player scored 5 goals

References

External links
Football federation of Tajikistan

Tajikistan Higher League seasons
1
Tajik
Tajik